is a Japanese musician, songwriter, record producer, and fashion designer, best known as guitarist of the visual kei rock band Malice Mizer from their formation in 1992 until their indefinite hiatus in 2001. A year later, Mana formed the gothic metal band Moi dix Mois as his solo project.

Mana founded the independent record label Midi:Nette in 1994. In addition to signing electronic music duo Schwarz Stein, it has released the majority of Malice Mizer's musical output and all of Moi dix Mois' material. His clothing label, Moi-même-Moitié, was established in 1999 and is credited with helping popularize the Gothic Lolita fashion movement.

Early life 
Mana was born on March 19 in Hiroshima. At an early age, he was introduced to classical music by his parents, who were both music teachers. Mana started making music when he was in high school, inspired by Mötley Crüe, and he learned to play the drums because of Tommy Lee. As a teen he had an aversion to all things "girly" and he described himself as a "macho" with a destructive attitude.

Career 
Mana's real name is not known publicly. His stage name, sometimes written with the kanji , reads "evil name" or "devil's name". His fans refer to him as Mana-sama.

Mana's first known band was the underground Ves.tearge in 1986. He later joined the punk rock group Girl'e, which was active from 1988 until 1990. He was known in both Ves.tearge and Girl'e by the stage name Serina, and was also a guitarist for both bands as well. After leaving them in April 1992, Mana and Matenrou guitarist Közi founded Malice Mizer in August. Mana was the band's lead guitarist, chief songwriter, choreographer and overall artistic director. After Malice Mizer went on an indefinite hiatus in 2001, Mana founded his solo project, Moi dix Mois in 2002. He composes all of the music, writes the lyrics, produces, directs and designs the members' stage costumes.

Mana founded the independent record label Midi:Nette in 1994 for the release of Malice Mizer's debut album, Memoire. In addition to most of Malice Mizer's work, and all of Moi dix Mois' work, Midi:Nette has also released music by the electronic visual kei duo Schwarz Stein. Signed to the label in 2002, Mana also produced for them. Despite their growing success, Schwarz Stein disbanded in March 2004.

In 1999, Mana created his own clothing label, Moi-même-Moitié, which features two lines of designs named "Elegant Gothic Lolita" and "Elegant Gothic Aristocrat". He regularly appears in the scene's top publication, the Gothic & Lolita Bible, modeling his own designs and giving updates on his various other projects. He is recognized internationally for his fashion endeavors; in 2007, British author Philomena Keet included him as one of seven designers in her Tokyo Look Book. Several other books dealing with Japanese fashion and culture have featured him, like Style Deficit Disorder. Moi-même-Moitié clothes and apparel were also sold in boutiques in Paris and the Netherlands, as well. As of October 2019, its collection is sold exclusively online.

In 2004, Mana started to branch out internationally by opening his fan club to overseas members (a rarity amongst Japanese musicians) and setting up international distribution channels for his music and fashion. He played his first concerts with Moi dix Mois outside Japan in March 2005 in Munich, Germany and Paris, France. During which he was interviewed and featured on the cover of European music magazines, such as the German goth magazine Orkus.

At the end of 2007 Moi dix Mois returned to Europe, performing in France (a DVD of the concert was released on January 30, 2008) and Germany, Finland, Sweden, Spain and Italy.

In 2012, Moi dix Mois announced their first Latin America tour titled Tetsugaku no kakera - Chapter Six ～ Latin América Tour. The band planned to visit Brasil, Chile, Argentina and Mexico. Later, the tour was canceled.

Mana has also produced solo vocalist and cellist Kanon Wakeshima, who debuted in May 2008 on Sony Defstar Records.

Musical style 
Mana's composing style is very feeling-oriented. He refuses to learn music theory as he wants to create melodies and harmonies unlike other bands and finds regular song progressions dull. He composed based on the story he first creates, choosing the sound suitable for the story, using mainly guitar and keyboard. He believes in a natural flow of composing, and thus "his compositions often change rhythm or key, have multiple melodies and are generally unpredictable".

Public image

Since the days of Malice Mizer, Mana rarely speaks in public. Although it was not a conscious decision at the beginning, he did latch onto the idea when the band's direction became apparent. He speaks normally in printed interviews, but in his filmed interviews he whispers into the ear of a band member or confidante, who then relates his words back to the interviewer. He has also been known to simply look at the camera as subtitles appear, as well as using Yes/No cards and expressing himself in mime or through musical instruments.

He has, however, spoken on a few occasions. In a 1996 Malice Mizer interview on the TV show Hot Wave, he quietly replied with his name and his position in the band when introduced. But throughout the rest of the interview, Mana whispered in Gackt's ear. He has also offered his vocals to the song, "Kyomu no Naka de no Yuugi". Mana has stated on Twitter that his vocals were not distorted for this song when he sung it live, but he did whisper the lyrics.

Mana is known for wearing female clothes. Mana himself has said that he wanted to be the ultimate onnagata. English-language Japanese music website JaME said he started discovering his "feminine side" before Malice Mizer. His lack of speaking, combined with his commitment to feminine dress, led to people believing he was actually female. Japanese music website Barks stated that after Mana and Malice Mizer, the number of visual kei bands with onnagata members increased.

Band history
 Ves.tearge – drums (high school) (1986–1987)
 Girl'e – guitar, synthesizer as Serina (1988–1990)
 Matenrou (摩天楼) – bass (1990–1992)
 Malice Mizer – guitar, synth guitar, keyboard, programming (1992–2001)
 Moi dix Mois – guitars, programming (2002–present)

Other appearances
 Art Marju Duchain – guitar (1994 Visual Art Collection Vol.1 ~喜劇的晚餐~ – 1996.11.08 "Visual Art Collection" ~喜劇的晚餐~, Shibuya O-West)
 Mana's Not Dead – drums ("Dis Inferno Vol. V" at Shibuya O-East on 2007.12.26, Visual-Kei DVD Magazine Vol. 2)

References

External links
 Official website
 Old official website
 Midi:Nette official website
 Moi-même-Moitié official website 
 Moi-même-Moitié official international distribution 
 Signature ESP guitars

Malice Mizer members
Visual kei musicians
Japanese heavy metal guitarists
Japanese rock guitarists
Japanese songwriters
Japanese fashion designers
Japanese male models
Male-to-female cross-dressers
Industrial musicians
Musicians from Hiroshima
Living people
Unidentified musicians
Lolita fashion
Year of birth missing (living people)
20th-century Japanese guitarists
21st-century Japanese guitarists